The family originated from Zenica, Bosnia and Herzegovina. Later, they migrated to an area close to Trebinje, Herzegovina. Later, they migrated to the region of Drobnjaci. Later, they settled in Njeguši.

Ancestors

External links
 The Njegoskij Fund Public Project: Private family archives-based digital documentary fund focused on history and culture of Royal Montenegro.

Family trees
Petrović-Njegoš dynasty